Alexandra M. (Alex) Schmidt is a Brazilian biostatistician and epidemiologist who works as an associate professor of biostatistics at McGill University in Canada. She is known for her research on spatiotemporal and multivariate statistics and their applications in environmental statistics.

Education and career
Schmidt earned bachelor's and master's degrees in statistics at the Federal University of Rio de Janeiro in 1994 and 1996 respectively.
She completed her Ph.D. in statistics in 2001 at the University of Sheffield. Her dissertation, Bayesian Spatial Interpolation of Pollution Monitoring Stations, was supervised by Tony O'Hagan.

She was a faculty member at the Federal University of Rio de Janeiro before moving to McGill in 2016.

Recognition
Schmidt became an Elected Member of the International Statistical Institute in 2010.
She was president of the International Society for Bayesian Analysis for the 2015 term.
She was elected as a Fellow of the American Statistical Association in 2020.

In 2017 the Section on Statistics and the Environment of the American Statistical Association gave Schmidt their Distinguished  Achievement Medal "for fundamental contributions to the development of spatio-temporal process theory, most notably to the theory of multivariate processes through coregionalization as well as the modelling of spatial covariance matrices; for related applications to the environmental and ecological science, and for service to the profession."

Publications
 An Adaptive resampling scheme for cycle estimation, 1998
 Spatial stochastic frontier models : accounting for unobserved local determinants of inefficiency, 2006

References

External links

Year of birth missing (living people)
Living people
Brazilian statisticians
Canadian statisticians
Women statisticians
Federal University of Rio de Janeiro alumni
Alumni of the University of Sheffield
Academic staff of the Federal University of Rio de Janeiro
Academic staff of McGill University
Elected Members of the International Statistical Institute
Fellows of the American Statistical Association